Diálogo is the spanish word for "dialogue" which may refer to:

Academia
 Diálogo (journal), a journal published at the University of Texas.

History
 El Diálogo, diplomatic talks between Cuba and Cuban exiles in 1979.

Music
 Diálogo?, 2004 album by the band NX Zero.